Naturvetarna is a federation of Swedish trade unions representing professionals working in natural science or related areas. The federation was established in 2009 by the merged of Naturvetareförbundet and Agrifack.

The federation has sections representing:
 Agronomists (Agronomförbundet)
 Biomedical analysts (Biomedicinska analytikerföreningen)
 Forest scientists (Delförbundet Skogsakademikerna)
 Dietists (Dietisternas riksförbund)
 Animal welfare inspectors (Djurskyddsinspektörernas riksförbund)
 Ecological engineers (Ekoingenjörernas riksförbund)
 Earth scientists (Geosektionen)
 Environment and health workers (Miljö- och hälsoskyddssektionen, MoH)
 Agronomical science teachers (Naturbrukslärarförbundet)
 Nutritionists (Nutritionistföreningen)
 Working environment inspectors (Sektionen Sveriges Arbetsmiljöinspektörer, SSAI)
 Hospital physicists (Svenska sjukhusfysikerförbundet)
 Hospital geneticists (Sveriges sjukhusgenetiker, SSG)

Årets geolog 
The earth scientists section awards each year the prize Årets geolog (Geologist of the Year) to outstanding geologists. The laureates are:

References

Professional associations based in Sweden